A number of animals are capable of aerial locomotion, either by powered flight or by gliding. This trait has appeared by evolution many times, without any single common ancestor. Flight has evolved at least four times in separate animals: insects, pterosaurs, birds, and bats. Gliding has evolved on many more occasions. Usually the development is to aid canopy animals in getting from tree to tree, although there are other possibilities. Gliding, in particular, has evolved among rainforest animals, especially in the rainforests in Asia (most especially Borneo) where the trees are tall and widely spaced. Several species of aquatic animals, and a few amphibians and reptiles have also evolved this gliding flight ability, typically as a means of evading predators.

Types
Animal aerial locomotion can be divided into two categories: powered and unpowered. In unpowered modes of locomotion, the animal uses aerodynamic forces exerted on the body due to wind or falling through the air. In powered flight, the animal uses muscular power to generate aerodynamic forces to climb or to maintain steady, level flight. Those who can find air that is rising faster than they are falling can gain altitude by soaring.

Unpowered
These modes of locomotion typically require an animal start from a raised location, converting that potential energy into kinetic energy and using aerodynamic forces to control trajectory and angle of descent. Energy is continually lost to drag without being replaced, thus these methods of locomotion have limited range and duration.
 Falling: decreasing altitude under the force of gravity, using no adaptations to increase drag or provide lift.
 Parachuting: falling at an angle greater than 45° from the horizontal with adaptations to increase drag forces. Very small animals may be carried up by the wind. Some gliding animals may use their gliding membranes for drag rather than lift, to safely descend.
 Gliding flight: falling at an angle less than 45° from the horizontal with lift from adapted aerofoil membranes. This allows slowly falling directed horizontal movement, with streamlining to decrease drag forces for aerofoil efficiency and often with some maneuverability in air. Gliding animals have a lower aspect ratio (wing length/breadth) than true flyers.

Powered flight
Powered flight has evolved at least four times: first in the insects, then in pterosaurs, next in birds, and last in bats. Studies on theropod dinosaurs do suggest multiple (≥3) independent acquisitions of powered flight however, and a recent study proposes independent acquisitions amidst the different bat clades as well. Powered flight uses muscles to generate aerodynamic force, which allows the animal to produce lift and thrust. The animal may ascend without the aid of rising air.

Externally powered
Ballooning and soaring are not powered by muscle, but rather by external aerodynamic sources of energy: the wind and rising thermals, respectively. Both can continue as long as the source of external power is present. Soaring is typically only seen in species capable of powered flight, as it requires extremely large wings.
 Ballooning: being carried up into the air from the aerodynamic effect on long strands of silk in the wind. Certain silk-producing arthropods, mostly small or young spiders, secrete a special light-weight gossamer silk for ballooning, sometimes traveling great distances at high altitude. 
 Soaring: gliding in rising or otherwise moving air that requires specific physiological and morphological adaptations that can sustain the animal aloft without flapping its wings. The rising air is due to thermals, ridge lift or other meteorological features. Under the right conditions, soaring creates a gain of altitude without expending energy. Large wingspans are needed for efficient soaring.

Many species will use multiple of these modes at various times; a hawk will use powered flight to rise, then soar on thermals, then descend via free-fall to catch its prey.

Evolution and ecology

Gliding and parachuting
While gliding occurs independently from powered flight, it has some ecological advantages of its own as it is the simplest form of flight. Gliding is a very energy-efficient way of travelling from tree to tree. Although moving through the canopy running along the branches may be less energetically demanding, the faster transition between trees allows for greater foraging rates in a particular patch. Glide ratios can be dependent on size and current behavior. Higher foraging rates are supported by low glide ratios as smaller foraging patches require less gliding time over shorter distances and greater amounts of food can be acquired in a shorter time period. Low ratios are not as energy efficient as the higher ratios, but an argument made is that many gliding animals eat low energy foods such as leaves and are restricted to gliding because of this, whereas flying animals eat more high energy foods such as fruits, nectar, and insects. Mammals tend to rely on lower glide ratios to increase the amount of time foraging for lower energy food. An equilibrium glide, achieving a constant airspeed and glide angle, is harder to obtain as animal size increases. Larger animals need to glide from much higher heights and longer distances to make it energetically beneficial. Gliding is also very suitable for predator avoidance, allowing for controlled targeted landings to safer areas. In contrast to flight, gliding has evolved independently many times (more than a dozen times among extant vertebrates); however these groups have not radiated nearly as much as have groups of flying animals.

Worldwide, the distribution of gliding animals is uneven, as most inhabit rain forests in Southeast Asia. (Despite seemingly suitable rain forest habitats, few gliders are found in India or New Guinea and none in Madagascar.) Additionally, a variety of gliding vertebrates are found in Africa, a family of hylids (flying frogs) lives in South America and several species of gliding squirrels are found in the forests of northern Asia and North America. Various factors produce these disparities. In the forests of Southeast Asia, the dominant canopy trees (usually dipterocarps) are taller than the canopy trees of the other forests. Forest structure and distance between trees are influential in the development of gliding within varying species. A higher start provides a competitive advantage of further glides and farther travel. Gliding predators may more efficiently search for prey. The lower abundance of insect and small vertebrate prey for carnivorous animals (such as lizards) in Asian forests may be a factor. In Australia, many mammals (and all mammalian gliders) possess, to some extent, prehensile tails. Globally, smaller gliding species tend to have feather-like tails and larger species have fur covered round bushy tails, but smaller animals tend to rely on parachuting rather than developing gliding membranes. The gliding membranes, patagium, are classified in the 4 groups of propatagium, digipatagium, plagiopatagium and uropatagium. These membranes consist of two tightly bounded layers of skin connected by muscles and connective tissue between the fore and hind limbs.

History

Powered flight evolution

Powered flight has evolved unambiguously only four times—birds, bats, pterosaurs, and insects (though see above for possible independent acquisitions within bird and bat groups). In contrast to gliding, which has evolved more frequently but typically gives rise to only a handful of species, all three extant groups of powered flyers have a huge number of species, suggesting that flight is a very successful strategy once evolved. Bats, after rodents, have the most species of any mammalian order, about 20% of all mammalian species. Birds have the most species of any class of terrestrial vertebrates. Finally, insects (most of which fly at some point in their life cycle) have more species than all other animal groups combined.

The evolution of flight is one of the most striking and demanding in animal evolution, and has attracted the attention of many prominent scientists and generated many theories. Additionally, because flying animals tend to be small and have a low mass (both of which increase the surface-area-to-mass ratio), they tend to fossilize infrequently and poorly compared to the larger, heavier-boned terrestrial species they share habitat with. Fossils of flying animals tend to be confined to exceptional fossil deposits formed under highly specific circumstances, resulting in a generally poor fossil record, and a particular lack of transitional forms. Furthermore, as fossils do not preserve behavior or muscle, it can be difficult to discriminate between a poor flyer and a good glider.

Insects were the first to evolve flight, approximately 350 million years ago. The developmental origin of the insect wing remains in dispute, as does the purpose prior to true flight. One suggestion is that wings initially evolved from tracheal gill structures and were used to catch the wind for small insects that live on the surface of the water, while another is that they evolved from paranotal lobes or leg structures and gradually progressed from parachuting, to gliding, to flight for originally arboreal insects.

Pterosaurs were the next to evolve flight, approximately 228 million years ago. These reptiles were close relatives of the dinosaurs, and reached enormous sizes, with some of the last forms being the largest flying animals ever to inhabit the Earth, having wingspans of over 9.1 m (30 ft). However, they spanned a large range of sizes, down to a 250 mm (10 in) wingspan in Nemicolopterus.

Birds have an extensive fossil record, along with many forms documenting both their evolution from small theropod dinosaurs and the numerous bird-like forms of theropod which did not survive the mass extinction at the end of the Cretaceous. Indeed, Archaeopteryx is arguably the most famous transitional fossil in the world, both due to its mix of reptilian and avian anatomy and the luck of being discovered only two years after Darwin's publication of On the Origin of Species. However, the ecology of this transition is considerably more contentious, with various scientists supporting either a "trees down" origin (in which an arboreal ancestor evolved gliding, then flight) or a "ground up" origin (in which a fast-running terrestrial ancestor used wings for a speed boost and to help catch prey).

Bats are the most recent to evolve (about 60 million years ago), most likely from a fluttering ancestor, though their poor fossil record has hindered more detailed study.

Only a few animals are known to have specialised in soaring: the larger of the extinct pterosaurs, and some large birds. Powered flight is very energetically expensive for large animals, but for soaring their size is an advantage, as it allows them a low wing loading, that is a large wing area relative to their weight, which maximizes lift. Soaring is very energetically efficient.

Biomechanics

Gliding and parachuting
During a free-fall with no aerodynamic forces, the object accelerates due to gravity, resulting in increasing velocity as the object descends. During parachuting, animals use the aerodynamic forces on their body to counteract the force or gravity. Any object moving through air experiences a drag force that is proportion to surface area and to velocity squared, and this force will partially counter the force of gravity, slowing the animal's descent to a safer speed. If this drag is oriented at an angle to the vertical, the animal's trajectory will gradually become more horizontal, and it will cover horizontal as well as vertical distance. Smaller adjustments can allow turning or other maneuvers. This can allow a parachuting animal to move from a high location on one tree to a lower location on another tree nearby. Specifically in gliding mammals, there are 3 types of gliding paths respectively being S glide, J glide, and "straight-shaped" glides where species either gain altitude post launch then descend, rapidly decrease height before gliding, and maintaining a constant angled descent.

During gliding, lift plays an increased role. Like drag, lift is proportional to velocity squared. Gliding animals will typically leap or drop from high locations such as trees, just as in parachuting, and as gravitational acceleration increases their speed, the aerodynamic forces also increase. Because the animal can utilize lift and drag to generate greater aerodynamic force, it can glide at a shallower angle than parachuting animals, allowing it to cover greater horizontal distance in the same loss of altitude, and reach trees further away. Successful flights for gliding animals are achieved through 5 steps: preparation, launch, glide, braking, and landing. Gliding species are better able to control themselves mid-air, with the tail acting as a rudder, making it capable to pull off banking movements or U-turns during flight. During landing, arboreal mammals will extend their fore and hind limbs in front of itself to brace for landing and to trap air in order to maximize air resistance and lower impact speed.

Powered flight
Unlike most air vehicles, in which the objects that generate lift (wings) and thrust (engine or propeller) are separate and the wings remain fixed, flying animals use their wings to generate both lift and thrust by moving them relative to the body. This has made the flight of organisms considerably harder to understand than that of vehicles, as it involves varying speeds, angles, orientations, areas, and flow patterns over the wings.

A bird or bat flying through the air at a constant speed moves its wings up and down (usually with some fore-aft movement as well). Because the animal is in motion, there is some airflow relative to its body which, combined with the velocity of its wings, generates a faster airflow moving over the wing. This will generate lift force vector pointing forwards and upwards, and a drag force vector pointing rearwards and upwards. The upwards components of these counteract gravity, keeping the body in the air, while the forward component provides thrust to counteract both the drag from the wing and from the body as a whole. Pterosaur flight likely worked in a similar manner, though no living pterosaurs remain for study.

Insect flight is considerably different, due to their small size, rigid wings, and other anatomical differences. Turbulence and vortices play a much larger role in insect flight, making it even more complex and difficult to study than the flight of vertebrates. There are two basic aerodynamic models of insect flight. Most insects use a method that creates a spiralling leading edge vortex. Some very small insects use the fling-and-clap or Weis-Fogh mechanism in which the wings clap together above the insect's body and then fling apart. As they fling open, the air gets sucked in and creates a vortex over each wing. This bound vortex then moves across the wing and, in the clap, acts as the starting vortex for the other wing. Circulation and lift are increased, at the price of wear and tear on the wings.

Limits and extremes

Flying and soaring
 Largest. Some other recently discovered azhdarchid pterosaur species, such as Hatzegopteryx, may have also wingspans of a similar size or even slightly larger. Although it is widely thought that Quetzalcoatlus reached the size limit of a flying animal, the same was once said of Pteranodon. The heaviest living flying animals are the kori bustard and the great bustard with males reaching . Studies have shown that it is physically possible for flying animals to reach  wingspans, but there is no firm evidence that any flying animal, not even the azhdarchid pterosaurs, got that large.

 Smallest. There is no minimum size for getting airborne. Indeed, there are many bacteria floating in the atmosphere that constitute part of the aeroplankton. However, to move about under one's own power and not be overly affected by the wind requires a certain amount of size. They are thought to represent the lower size limit for endotherm flight.
 Fastest. The fastest animal in flapping horizontal flight may be the Mexican free-tailed bat, said to attain about  based on ground speed by an aircraft tracking device; that measurement does not separate any contribution from wind speed, so the observations could be caused by strong tailwinds.
 Slowest. Most flying animals need to travel forward to stay aloft. However, some creatures can stay in the same spot, known as hovering, either by rapidly flapping the wings, as do hummingbirds, hoverflies, dragonflies, and some others, or carefully using thermals, as do some birds of prey.
 Highest flying. The animal that flies highest most regularly is the bar-headed goose Anser indicus, which migrates directly over the Himalayas between its nesting grounds in Tibet and its winter quarters in India.

Gliding and parachuting
 Most efficient glider. This can be taken as the animal that moves most horizontal distance per metre fallen. Flying fish have been observed to glide for hundreds of metres on the drafts on the edge of waves with only their initial leap from the water to provide height, but may be obtaining additional lift from wave motion. On the other hand, albatrosses have measured lift–drag ratios of 20, and thus fall just 1 meter for every 20 in still air.
 Most maneuverable glider. Many gliding animals have some ability to turn, but which is the most maneuverable is difficult to assess. Even paradise tree snakes, Chinese gliding frogs, and gliding ants have been observed as having considerable capacity to turn in the air.

Flying animals

Extant

Insects
 Pterygota: The first of all animals to evolve flight, they are also the only invertebrates that have evolved flight. As they comprise almost all insects, the species are too numerous to list here. Insect flight is an active research field.

Birds

 Birds (flying, soaring) – Most of the approximately 10,000 living species can fly (flightless birds are the exception). Bird flight is one of the most studied forms of aerial locomotion in animals. See List of soaring birds for birds that can soar as well as fly.

Mammals

 Bats. There are approximately 1,240 bat species, representing about 20% of all classified mammal species. Most bats are nocturnal and many feed on insects while flying at night, using echolocation to hone in on their prey.

 Humans. Humans are currently the only extant species known to be capable of flight by the use of tools like airplanes, helicopters, hot air balloons, and rigid airships like the Zeppelin, amongst many other examples.

Extinct

Pterosaurs
 Pterosaurs were the first flying vertebrates, and are generally agreed to have been sophisticated flyers. They had large wings formed by a patagium stretching from the torso to a dramatically lengthened fourth finger. There were hundreds of species, most of which are thought to have been intermittent flappers, and many soarers. The largest known flying animals are pterosaurs.

Non-avian dinosaurs
 Theropods (gliding and flying). There were several species of theropod dinosaur thought to be capable of gliding or flying, that are not classified as birds (though they are closely related). Some species (Microraptor gui, Microraptor zhaoianus, and Changyuraptor) have been found that were fully feathered on all four limbs, giving them four 'wings' that they are believed to have used for gliding or flying. A recent study indicates that flight may have been acquired independently in various different lineages though it may have only evolved in theropods of the Avialae.

Gliding animals

Extant

Insects
 Gliding bristletails. Directed aerial gliding descent is found in some tropical arboreal bristletails, an ancestrally wingless sister taxa to the winged insects. The bristletails median caudal filament is important for the glide ratio and gliding control
 Gliding ants. The flightless workers of these insects have secondarily gained some capacity to move through the air. Gliding has evolved independently in a number of arboreal ant species from the groups Cephalotini, Pseudomyrmecinae, and Formicinae (mostly Camponotus). All arboreal dolichoderines and non-cephalotine myrmicines except Daceton armigerum do not glide. Living in the rainforest canopy like many other gliders, gliding ants use their gliding to return to the trunk of the tree they live on should they fall or be knocked off a branch. Gliding was first discovered for Cephalotes atreus in the Peruvian rainforest. Cephalotes atreus can make 180 degree turns, and locate the trunk using visual cues, succeeding in landing 80% of the time. Unique among gliding animals, Cephalotini and Pseudomyrmecinae ants glide abdomen first, the Forminicae however glide in the more conventional head first manner.
 Gliding immature insects. The wingless immature stages of some insect species that have wings as adults may also show a capacity to glide. These include some species of cockroach, mantis, katydid, stick insect and true bug. Skydiving spiders discovered in South America

Spiders
 Ballooning spiders (parachuting). The young of some species of spiders travel through the air by using silk draglines to catch the wind, as may some smaller species of adult spider, such as the money spider family. This behavior is commonly known as "ballooning". Ballooning spiders make up part of the aeroplankton.
 Gliding spiders. Some species of arboreal spider of the genus Selenops can glide back to the trunk of a tree should they fall. Skydiving spiders discovered in South America

Molluscs
 Flying squid. Several oceanic squids of the family Ommastrephidae, such as the Pacific flying squid, will leap out of the water to escape predators, an adaptation similar to that of flying fish. Small fins towards the back of the mantle do not produce much lift, but do help stabilize the motion of flight. They exit the water by expelling water out of their funnel, indeed some squid have been observed to continue jetting water while airborne providing thrust even after leaving the water. This may make flying squid the only animals with jet-propelled aerial locomotion.

Fish
 Flying fish. There are over 50 species of flying fish belonging to the family Exocoetidae. They are mostly marine fishes of small to medium size. They can be divided into two-winged varieties and four-winged varieties. The fish can also make a series of glides, each time dipping the tail into the water to produce forward thrust. The longest recorded series of glides, with the fish only periodically dipping its tail in the water, was for 45 seconds (Video here). It has been suggested that the genus Exocoetus is on an evolutionary borderline between flight and gliding. It flaps its enlarged pectoral fins when airborne, but still seems only to glide, as there is no hint of a power stroke. It has been found that some flying fish can glide as effectively as some flying birds. 
 live bearers
 Halfbeaks. A group related to the Exocoetidae, one or two hemirhamphid species possess enlarged pectoral fins and show true gliding flight rather than simple leaps. Marshall (1965) reports that Euleptorhamphus viridis can cover  in two separate hops.
 Trinidadian guppies have been observed exhibiting a gliding response to escape predator's 
 Freshwater butterflyfish (possibly gliding). Pantodon buchholzi has the ability to jump and possibly glide a short distance. It can move through the air several times the length of its body. While it does this, the fish flaps its large pectoral fins, giving it its common name. However, it is debated whether the freshwater butterfly fish can truly glide, Saidel et al. (2004) argue that it cannot.
 Freshwater Hatchet fish- in the wild they have been observed jumping out of the water and gliding (although reports of them achieving powered flight has been brought up many times)
Gliding has evolved independently in two families of tree frogs, the Old World Rhacophoridae and the New World Hylidae. Within each lineage there are a range of gliding abilities from non-gliding, to parachuting, to full gliding.

 Rhacophoridae flying frogs. A number of the Rhacophoridae, such as Wallace's flying frog (Rhacophorus nigropalmatus), have adaptations for gliding, the main feature being enlarged toe membranes. For example, the Malayan flying frog Rhacophorus prominanus glides using the membranes between the toes of its limbs, and small membranes located at the heel, the base of the leg, and the forearm. Some of the frogs are quite accomplished gliders, for example, the Chinese flying frog Rhacophorus dennysi can maneuver in the air, making two kinds of turn, either rolling into the turn (a banked turn) or yawing into the turn (a crabbed turn).
 Hylidae flying frogs. The other frog family that contains gliders.

Reptiles
Several lizards and snakes are capable of gliding:

  Draco lizards. There are 28 species of lizard of the genus Draco, found in Sri Lanka, India, and Southeast Asia. They live in trees, feeding on tree ants, but nest on the forest floor. Unusually, their patagium (gliding membrane) is supported on elongated ribs rather than the more common situation among gliding vertebrates of having the patagium attached to the limbs. When extended, the ribs form a semicircle on either side the lizard's body and can be folded to the body like a folding fan.
 Gliding lacertids. There are two species of gliding lacertid, of the genus Holaspis, found in Africa. They have fringed toes and tail sides and can flatten their bodies for gliding or parachuting.
  Ptychozoon flying geckos. There are six species of gliding gecko, of the genus Ptychozoon, from Southeast Asia. These lizards have small flaps of skin along their limbs, torso, tail, and head that catch the air and enable them to glide.
 Lupersaurus flying geckos. A possible sister-taxon to Ptychozoon which has similar flaps and folds and also glides.
 Thecadactylus flying geckos. At least some species of Thecadactylus, such as T. rapicauda, are known to glide.
 Cosymbotus flying gecko. Similar adaptations to Ptychozoon are found in the two species of the gecko genus Cosymbotus.
 Chrysopelea snakes. Five species of snake from Southeast Asia, Melanesia, and India. The paradise tree snake of southern Thailand, Malaysia, Borneo, Philippines, and Sulawesi is the most capable glider of those snakes studied. It glides by stretching out its body sideways and opening its ribs so the belly is concave, and by making lateral slithering movements.

Mammals
Bats are the only freely flying mammals. A few other mammals can glide or parachute; the best known are flying squirrels and flying lemurs.

 Flying squirrels (subfamily Petauristinae). There are more than 40 living species divided between 14 genera of flying squirrel. Flying squirrels are found in Asia (most species), North America (genus Glaucomys) and Europe (Siberian flying squirrel). They inhabit tropical, temperate, and Subarctic environments, with the Glaucomys preferring boreal and montane coniferous forests, specifically landing on red spruce (Picea rubens) trees as landing sites; they are known to rapidly climb trees, but take some time to locate a good landing spot. They tend to be nocturnal and are highly sensitive to light and noise. When a flying squirrel wishes to cross to a tree that is further away than the distance possible by jumping, it extends the cartilage spur on its elbow or wrist. This opens out the flap of furry skin (the patagium) that stretches from its wrist to its ankle. It glides spread-eagle and with its tail fluffed out like a parachute, and grips the tree with its claws when it lands.
 Anomalures or scaly-tailed flying squirrels (family Anomaluridae). These brightly coloured African rodents are not squirrels but have evolved to a resemble flying squirrels by convergent evolution. There are seven species, divided in three genera. All but one species have gliding membranes between their front and hind legs. The genus Idiurus contains two particularly small species known as flying mice, but similarly they are not true mice.
 Colugos or "flying lemurs" (order Dermoptera). There are two species of colugo. Despite their common name, colugos are not lemurs; true lemurs are primates. Molecular evidence suggests that colugos are a sister group to primates; however, some mammalogists suggest they are a sister group to bats. Found in Southeast Asia, the colugo is probably the mammal most adapted for gliding, with a patagium that is as large as geometrically possible. They have the most developed propatagium out of any gliding mammal with a mean launch velocity of approximately 3.7 m/s; the Mayan Colugo has been known to initiate glides without jumping.
 Sifaka, a type of lemur, and possibly some other primates (possible limited gliding or parachuting). A number of primates have been suggested to have adaptations that allow limited gliding or parachuting: sifakas, indris, galagos and saki monkeys. Most notably, the sifaka, a type of lemur, has thick hairs on its forearms that have been argued to provide drag, and a small membrane under its arms that has been suggested to provide lift by having aerofoil properties.
 Flying phalangers or wrist-winged gliders (subfamily Petaurinae). Possums found in Australia, and New Guinea. The gliding membranes are hardly noticeable until they jump. On jumping, the animal extends all four legs and stretches the loose folds of skin. The subfamily contains seven species. Of the six species in the genus Petaurus, the sugar glider and the Biak glider are the most common species. The lone species in the genus Gymnobelideus, Leadbeater's possum has only a vestigial gliding membrane.
 Greater glider (Petauroides volans). The only species of the genus Petauroides of the family Pseudocheiridae. This marsupial is found in Australia, and was originally classed with the flying phalangers, but is now recognised as separate. Its flying membrane only extends to the elbow, rather than to the wrist as in Petaurinae. It has elongated limbs compared to its non-gliding relatives.
 Feather-tailed possums (family Acrobatidae). This family of marsupials contains two genera, each with one species. The feathertail glider (Acrobates pygmaeus), found in Australia is the size of a very small mouse and is the smallest mammalian glider. The feathertail possum (Distoechurus pennatus) is found in New Guinea, but does not glide. Both species have a stiff-haired feather-like tail.

Extinct

Reptiles
 Extinct reptiles similar to Draco. There are a number of unrelated extinct lizard-like reptiles with similar "wings" to the Draco lizards. These include the Late Permian Weigeltisauridae, the Triassic Kuehneosauridae and Mecistotrachelos, and the Cretaceous lizard Xianglong.
 Sharovipterygidae. These strange reptiles from the Upper Triassic of Kyrgyzstan and Poland unusually had a membrane on their elongated hind limbs, extending their otherwise normal, flying-squirrel-like patagia significantly. The forelimbs are in contrast much smaller.

 Hypuronector. This bizarre drepanosaur displays limb proportions, particularly the elongated forelimbs, that are consistent with a flying or gliding animal with patagia.

Non-avian dinosaurs
  Scansoriopterygidae is unique among dinosaurs for the development of membranous wings, unlike the feathered airfoils of other theropods. Much like modern anomalures it developed a bony rod to help support the wing, albeit on the wrist and not the elbow.

Fish
 Thoracopteridae is a lineage of Triassic flying fish-like Perleidiformes, having converted their pectoral and pelvic fins into broad wings very similar to those of their modern counterparts. The Ladinian genus Potanichthys is the oldest member of this clade, suggesting that these fish began exploring aerial niches soon after the Permian-Triassic extinction event.

Mammals
 Volaticotherium antiquum. A gliding eutriconodont, long considered the earliest gliding mammal until the discovery of contemporary gliding haramiyidans. It lived around 164 million years ago and used a fur-covered skin membrane to glide through the air. The closely related Argentoconodon is also thought to have been able to glide, based on postcranial similarities; it lived around 165 million years ago, during the Middle-Late Jurassic of what is now China 
 The haramiyidans Vilevolodon, Xianshou, Maiopatagium and Arboroharamiya known from the Middle-Late Jurassic of China had extensive patagia, highly convergent with those of colugos.
A gliding metatherian (possibly a marsupial) is known from the Paleocene of Itaboraí, Brazil.
A gliding rodent belonging to the extinct family Eomyidae, Eomys quercyi is known from the late Oligocene of Germany.

See also
Animal locomotion
Flying mythological creatures
Insect thermoregulation
Organisms at high altitude

References

Further reading
 
 
 
 
 
 
 
 The Pterosaurs: From Deep Time by David Unwin

External links

 Canopy Locomotion from Mongabay online magazine
 Learn the Secrets of Flight from Vertebrate Flight Exhibit at UCMP
 Canopy life
 Insect flight, photographs of flying insects – Rolf Nagels
 Map of Life - "Gliding mammals" – University of Cambridge

 
Ethology
Evolution of animals
Natural history